Vicente Lopez or Vicente López may refer to:Vincenta Lopez

People
Vicente López Portaña (1772–1850), Spanish painter
Vicente López y Planes (1785–1856), Argentine writer and politician
Vicente Fidel López (1815–1903), Argentine historian and politician, son of López y Planes
Vicente María Epifanio López Madrigal (1880–1972), Filipino businessman
Vicente López Carril (1942–1980), Spanish road racing cyclist
Vicente Lopez, Filipino sprinter and gold medallist at the 1921 Far Eastern Championship Games
Vicente Carballo López (1928–2010), Cuban baseball pitcher and player in the 1957 Caribbean Series

Places
Vicente López Partido, area of Greater Buenos Aires
Vicente López, Buenos Aires, neighbourhood in the above area
Estadio Ciudad de Vicente López, sports stadium in the above area
Plaza Vicente López y Planes, square in Buenos Aires